Johan Baazius the younger (17 July 1626 – 12 May 1681) was a Swedish clergyman who served as Archbishop of Uppsala in the Church of Sweden.

Biography
Johan Baazius was born in Jönköping. He was the son of Johan Baazius the elder  (1581–1649),  theologian and bishop of the  Diocese of Växjö. 

He was known as knowledgeable already at a young age. After further studies in Uppsala University, Königsberg University (Królewiec University) and other universities, mainly in Germany, he was appointed teacher for Nils Brahe,  nephew of Per Brahe the Younger,  Lord High Steward of Sweden. In 1653 he was also made court chaplain by Queen Christina. After this he held various offices, including as bishop of the  Diocese of Växjö from 1667, bishop of Diocese of Skara 1673, and finally Archbishop of Uppsala in  1677. 

Baazius died suddenly in his sleep after returning from a visit to Stockholm. He was succeeded as Archbishop of Uppsala  by Olov Svebilius.

References

Other sources
 Nordisk familjebok (1904), article Baazius

1626 births
1681 deaths
People from Jönköping
Lutheran archbishops of Uppsala
Bishops of Skara
Bishops of Växjö
17th-century Lutheran archbishops
17th-century Swedish people